is a Japanese football manager and former player. He was previously the head coach of the Singapore national team, serving from 2019 to 2021. He was most recently the head coach of Ventforet Kofu.

As a player, Yoshida spent the majority of his career with Montedio Yamagata.

Early life
Yoshida was born in Chiba Prefecture on June 9, 1974.

Playing career

Youth career
During his junior high school years, he played for the Hitachi Junior Youth Soccer Club.

Senior career
After graduating from Urayasu High School, he joined his local club Kashiwa Reysol in 1993. In 1997, he moved to Kyoto Purple Sanga.

In 1999, he moved to newly promoted J2 League club, Montedio Yamagata. He became a regular for them, playing as a defensive midfielder. During the final day of the 1999 J.League Division 2 season, Yoshida scored a late long range free kick goal against Oita Trinita, denying their chances of being promoted to the J.League Division 1.

In 2002, he moved to Singapore and played for Jurong in the S-League (now Singapore Premier League). After five appearances, he retired at the end of the 2002 season.

Coaching career

Return to Kashiwa Reysol
Yoshida returned to Kashiwa Reysol in 2003 and spent seven years as director of the club's academy, where he helped to establish it as one of the best in the country. Japan internationals Hiroki Sakai, Masato Kudo and Kosuke Nakamura were groomed during his time there. Yoshida spent a further three years as Reysol's sports director before succeeding as head coach for the 2015 season on a two-year contract.

As head coach, Reysol that season produced a respectable performance at the Asian Champions League (AFC), reaching the quarter-finals before losing to Guangzhou, the eventual winners of the competition that year. Reysol had also finished at the semi finals of that year's Emperor's Cup. However, performances in the domestic league was lacklustre, and Yoshida's stint was cut short.

Albriex Niigata
The following year, he was appointed as head coach of Albirex Niigata, before going on to coach Ventforet Kofu in 2017. Ventforet was relegated to J2 League end of 2017 season and Yoshida was subsequently dismissed in April 2018.

Singapore
On 30 May 2019, Tatsuma Yoshida was unveiled as the head coach of the Singapore national team. Yoshida's first game in change for the national team began with a 4–3 victory against the Solomon Islands at the National Stadium. Yoshida extended his contract in 2021, but ended his stint by mutual agreement citing family reasons on 28 December that same year shortly after the 2020 AFF Suzuki Cup, whereby the Singapore team reached the semi-finals.

Return to Ventforet Kofu
On 3 January 2022, the club confirmed that he will return to the club for the 2022 J2 League season. On 16 October 2022, he brought his club won 2022 Emperor's Cup for the first time in history.

Club statistics

Managerial statistics

Honours

Manager
Ventforet Kofu
 Emperor's Cup: 2022

Notes and references

Notes

References

External links

 
 
 

1974 births
Living people
Association football people from Chiba Prefecture
Jurong FC
Japanese footballers
J1 League players
J2 League players
Japan Football League (1992–1998) players
Kashiwa Reysol players
Kyoto Sanga FC players
Montedio Yamagata players
Japanese football managers
J1 League managers
J2 League managers
Kashiwa Reysol managers
Albirex Niigata managers
Ventforet Kofu managers
Association football midfielders